The Namaqua plated lizard or Karoo plated lizard (Gerrhosaurus typicus) is a species of lizard in the Gerrhosauridae family.
It is endemic to South Africa.

References

Gerrhosaurus
Reptiles of South Africa
Reptiles described in 1837
Taxa named by Andrew Smith (zoologist)
Taxonomy articles created by Polbot